The Ministry of Finance (Uzbek: Молия вазирлги; Mоliya vazirligi) is the government agency of Uzbekistan which oversees taxation and budgeting in the country. It is split into regional and city financial departments which manage their assigned areas. The ministry evaluates government foreign loans, oversees drafting of state budget plans and taxation. It is headquartered in Tashkent.

Ministers 
 Erkin Boqiboyev, 1991 - 1994
 Baxtiyor Hamidov, 1994 - 1998
 Rustam Azimov, 1998 - 2000 
 Mamarizo Nurmurodov, 2000 - 2004
 Saidahmad Rahimov, 2004 - 2005
 Rustam Azimov, 2005 - 2016 
 Botir Xoʻjayev, 2016 - 2017
 Djamshid Kuchkarov, 2017 - 2020
 Timur Ishmetov, 2020 -

See also
Economy of Uzbekistan

References

Uzbekistan
Government ministries of Uzbekistan
Economy of Uzbekistan
Uzbekistan
1992 establishments in Uzbekistan